Michael Thomas Yome (born 29 August 1994) is a Gibraltarian footballer who plays for St Joseph's and the Gibraltar national team.

Career
Yome began his career as a youth at Gibraltar United, before moving across the border to play for Recreativo Linense and Atletico Zabal. He later returned to Gibraltar signing with Premier Division reigning Champions Lincoln Red Imps and remained at the club until January 2016, signing for Manchester 62 for the remainder of the campaign. Internationally, Yome has 7 caps for the Gibraltar National Team.

Yome moved to the UK to study teaching at Canterbury Christ Church University, and joined Canterbury City for the duration of his course. He scored on his debut for the club in their Kent Senior Trophy tie against Meridian in a 6–0 victory. At the end of the season, Yome scored once in 13 appearances to help City to a 9th place finish in the 2016–17 Southern Counties East Football League.

In August 2017, he entered talks with reigning Gibraltar Premier Division champions Europa, after leaving Canterbury City. His signing was confirmed by the club on 16 August 2017. After 5 years at the club, he was released in July 2022. He subsequently joined St Joseph's in August 2022.

International career
Yome made his international debut on 4 September 2015 against the Republic of Ireland in the Euro 2016 qualifiers.

Honours
With Europa
Rock Cup: 2017–18, 2019
Pepe Reyes Cup: 2018

References

External links
Michael Yome Gibraltar FA

1994 births
Living people
Gibraltarian footballers
Gibraltar international footballers
Gibraltarian expatriate footballers
Canterbury City F.C. players
Europa F.C. players
Lincoln Red Imps F.C. players
Manchester 62 F.C. players
Association football midfielders
Association football forwards
Gibraltar Premier Division players
Gibraltarian expatriate sportspeople in Spain
Gibraltarian expatriate sportspeople in England
Expatriate footballers in England
Expatriate footballers in Spain